Raymond François Lantier (11 July 1886, Lisieux – 2 April 1980, Le Vésinet) was a 20th-century French archaeologist.

Biography 

He was assistant curator in 1926, then Chief curator from 1933 to 1956, of the National Archaeological Museum at Saint-Germain-en-Laye. Meanwhile, he officiated as a professor of national and prehistoric antiquities in the École du Louvre.

A member of the Académie des Inscriptions et Belles-Lettres from 1946 until his death, Raymond Lantier was also a member of the Comité des travaux historiques et scientifiques. He was officier of the Legion of Honour and of the Ordre des Palmes Académiques.

Selected bibliography

References

External links 
 Fiche biographique sur le site du CTHS.

People from Lisieux
1886 births
1980 deaths
French archaeologists
Members of the Académie des Inscriptions et Belles-Lettres
Officiers of the Légion d'honneur
Officiers of the Ordre des Palmes Académiques
20th-century archaeologists